The Goethals Monument in Panama City, Panama was constructed in honor of George Washington Goethals the chief engineer of the Panama Canal and United States Army General.  He also was the State Engineer of New Jersey and the Acting Quartermaster General of the United States Army in WWI.

It was designed by Alfred P. Shaw of Chicago and was built by the Martinz de Panamá construction company.

The monument is a white Vermont marble construction and was revealed to the public on March 31, 1954. Its central high part symbolizes the Continental Divide and the piles on the sides represent the Canal locks, from which the waters of Gatun Lake reach the oceans.

References

Monuments and memorials in South America
Panama Canal